Rancho Dominguez Preparatory School (RDPS) is a public middle and high school in Long Beach, California in the Los Angeles metropolitan area, California, United States. It is a part of the Los Angeles Unified School District. It was previously named South Region High School #4.

 most of the students reside in the Wilmington area of Los Angeles and the City of Carson.

History
It opened in 2011, relieving Banning High School, Carson High School, Carnegie Middle School, and Curtiss Middle School.

Curriculum and student culture
They also have several AP courses, extracurriculars, and a high school news publication.

References

External links
 Rancho Dominguez Preparatory School

High schools in Long Beach, California
Middle schools in California
Los Angeles Unified School District schools
2011 establishments in California
Educational institutions established in 2011